István Kovács (born 1950 in Nádudvar) is a Hungarian wrestler. He was born in Nádudvar in Hajdú-Bihar County. He was Olympic bronze medalist in Freestyle wrestling in 1980. He won a gold medal at the 1979 World Wrestling Championships.

References

External links
 

1950 births
Living people
People from Nádudvar
Olympic wrestlers of Hungary
Wrestlers at the 1972 Summer Olympics
Wrestlers at the 1976 Summer Olympics
Wrestlers at the 1980 Summer Olympics
Hungarian male sport wrestlers
Olympic bronze medalists for Hungary
Olympic medalists in wrestling
World Wrestling Championships medalists
Medalists at the 1980 Summer Olympics
Sportspeople from Hajdú-Bihar County
20th-century Hungarian people
21st-century Hungarian people